The 2013 season was the Green Bay Packers' 95th season overall, 93rd in the National Football League and eighth under head coach Mike McCarthy. The Packers came into the 2013 season looking to win the NFC North for the 3rd year in a row. They came off a 45–31 loss to the San Francisco 49ers in the NFC Divisional Playoffs the previous season. The Packers started the 2013 season in a rematch with the 49ers, to whom they lost 28–34. After winning their home opener against the Redskins, Green Bay lost 34–30 in Cincinnati to the Bengals after holding a 30–14 lead in the 3rd quarter. Following the loss in Cincinnati, the Packers won 4 games in a row to sit at 5–2 before losing a Monday Night game at home to the Bears, 20–27. In that game, the Packers lost star quarterback Aaron Rodgers to a broken collarbone in the 1st quarter. He would be replaced by backups Scott Tolzien and Matt Flynn during recovery. In Week 12, the Packers tied the Vikings 26–26; it was Green Bay's first tie since 1987.

The Packers would lose the next game 40–10 to the Lions on Thanksgiving to sit at 5–6–1, threatening to miss the postseason for the first time since 2008. The Packers then rallied to beat the Falcons 22–21 to even their record at 6–6–1. The following week, the Packers defeated the Dallas Cowboys 37–36 in Dallas after they had trailed 26–3 at halftime. The comeback was the largest in franchise history. The Packers would then lose a shootout with the Pittsburgh Steelers 31–38 at home to sit at 7–7–1, the first meeting between the teams since Super Bowl XLV. The following week, the Packers defeated the Chicago Bears 33–28 at Soldier Field to clinch the NFC North in a game in which the winner would clinch the division. The game is well known for a touchdown catch made by Randall Cobb from Aaron Rodgers with less than a minute remaining to seal the win. The play came on a 4th and 8 situation in which Cobb was wide open near the endzone. After the win the team finished the regular season with an 8–7–1 record. The Packers entered the playoffs as the 4th seed in the NFC. In the wild card game, they lost 23–20 in a rematch with the 49ers on a Phil Dawson field goal as time expired.

Offseason

2013 NFL draft

Notes

The Packers traded pick No. 55 to receive No. 61 and No. 173 from the San Francisco 49ers.
The Packers traded pick No. 88 to receive No. 93 and No. 216 from the San Francisco 49ers.
The Packers traded pick No. 93 to receive No. 109, No. 146 and No. 224 from the Miami Dolphins.
The Packers traded picks No. 146 and No. 173 to receive No. 125 from the Denver Broncos.
J. C. Tretter began the season on the physically unable to perform list.
Kevin Dorsey began the season on the injured reserve list.

Free agents

RFA: Restricted free agent, UFA: Unrestricted free agent, ERFA: Exclusive rights free agent, FT: Franchise Tag

Staff

Final roster

Schedule

Preseason

Regular season

Note: Intra-division opponents are in bold text.

Postseason

Game summaries

Regular season

Week 1: at San Francisco 49ers

Week 2: vs. Washington Redskins

Following their loss to the 49ers 28–34 at Candlestick Park in Week 1, the Packers went back home to Lambeau to take on the 0–1 Washington Redskins. On the opening drive, Eddie Lacy suffered a concussion after a helmet-to helmet hit with Brandon Meriweather. He exited the game and James Starks replaced him. The Packers drew first blood with a 28-yard field goal. They then followed it up with a 35-yard touchdown pass to Randall Cobb on 4th and 3 to take a 10–0 lead. The Packers took advantage of Robert Griffin III's limited mobility and shut out the Redskins' offense in the 1st half. The Packers continued to pile up yards and points, first with a 14-yard touchdown pass to Jordy Nelson and then with a 3-yard touchdown pass to Jermichael Finley. By halftime, the Packers had a commanding 24–0 lead. Early in the 3rd quarter, Aaron Rodgers once again connected with Jordy Nelson for a 15-yard touchdown to take a 31–0 lead. The Redskins finally manage to sustain a drive and capped it off with a 6-yard touchdown pass to Pierre Garçon. However, the Packers responded with a 32-yard touchdown run by James Starks to make it 38–7. The Redskins managed to score two more touchdowns in the 4th quarter, first a 3-yard touchdown pass to Jordan Reed, then a 9-yard touchdown pass to Santana Moss (failed 2-point conversion). Up 38–20 with 7:36 remaining in the 4th, the Packers managed to sustain a drive to run out the clock and win their first game of the 2013 season. Aaron Rodgers was 34–42 for 480 yards and 4 touchdown passes, while James Starks rushed 20 times for 132 yards and a touchdown. Rodgers managed to tie Matt Flynn against Detroit in 2011 for the franchise record of passing yards in a single game (480). With the win, the Packers were 1–1.

Week 3: at Cincinnati Bengals

Both teams each committed four turnovers with Aaron Rodgers throwing two interceptions and Andy Dalton throwing one pick to Sam Shields. Two other Packer turnovers were fumbles with the last fumble came from Johnathan Franklin with Terence Newman returning a fumble return for a touchdown to give the Bengals the lead. With the loss, the Packers fell to 1–2 entering their bye week.

Week 5: vs. Detroit Lions

After the heart-breaking 30–34 loss to the Cincinnati Bengals in Paul Brown Stadium, the Packers return to action after their Week 4 bye to take on the 3–1 Detroit Lions at Lambeau. Eddie Lacy returned to action after recovering from a concussion in the past two weeks. He had a very productive game, rushing 23 times for 99 yards. After forcing the Lions to punt on their first possession, the Packers struck first with a 26-yard field goal. They followed it up with a 52-yard field goal to take a 6–0 lead. The Lions managed to answer with a 53-yard field goal to go into halftime down 3–6. Early in the 3rd quarter, Randall Cobb rushed to the Lions 22-yard line for a 67-yard gain. From there, the Packers kicked a 31-yard field goal to take a 9–3 lead. Following a Lions 3-and-out, the Packers struck again with an 83-yard touchdown pass to James Jones to take a 16–3 lead. In the 4th quarter, the Packers added two more field goals, one 42 yards and the other 45 yards, to take a 22–3 lead. The Lions finally find the endzone with a 13-yard touchdown pass to Kris Durham (failed 2-point conversion) to make it 22–9 with 2:04 remaining. However, the Packers ran out the remaining clock and won. The Packers reach .500 again with a 2–2 record.

Week 6: at Baltimore Ravens

After defeating the Detroit Lions 22–9 at Lambeau Field, the Packers travelled to M&T Bank Stadium to take on the defending Super Bowl champions Baltimore Ravens. Eddie Lacy had a breakout game, rushing for 120 yards on 23 carries. On the first drive, Lacy rushed for 10- and 37-yard gains before settling for a 45-yard field goal to take a 3–0 lead. Both defenses played exceptionally well in the 1st half, highlighted by Green Bay's 4th down goal-line stand against Bernard Pierce. The Packers suffered severe injuries to the offense, however, as both James Jones and Randall Cobb would exit the game in the 1st half with leg injuries. 4th-string receiver Jarrett Boykin saw extended playing time in the wake of their absences. With less than 20 seconds remaining in the half, Nick Perry forced a Joe Flacco fumble that was returned by Datone Jones to the 13-yard line. From there, the Packers settled for a 31-yard field goal and a 6–0 lead at halftime. After trading punts to begin the 2nd half, Aaron Rodgers' pass intended for Jordy Nelson was intercepted by Jimmy Smith in the endzone. After Baltimore punted, Jarrett Boykin, who struggled in the 1st half, took a screen pass 43 yards to the Baltimore 25. From there, the Packers extended their lead to 9–0 after a 50-yard field goal. Following a 53-yard pass to Marlon Brown, the Ravens settled for a 23-yard field goal. Late in the 3rd quarter, Aaron Rodgers lofted a 64-yard pass to Jordy Nelson to extend their lead 16–3. However, the Ravens stayed in the ballgame with an 11-yard pass to Jacoby Jones. The Packers tried to ice the game with a 31-yard field goal to make it 19–10 with 4:17 remaining in the 4th quarter. However, on 4th and 21, Joe Flacco found a wide open Tandon Doss for 63 yards. It appeared that Jerron McMillian slipped while covering Doss. On the very next play, Flacco found Desmond Clark for an 18-yard touchdown to make it 19–17 with 2:04 remaining. The Packers preserved the 2-point lead with a 52-yard pass to Jermichael Finley on 3rd and 3 and with a 4-yard run by Eddie Lacy on 3rd and 2. With the 19–17 win, the Packers went above .500 for the first time in the 2013 season with a 3–2 record. After the game, Randall Cobb would be put on IR with designation to return, and James Jones would be out for the next 2 games.

Week 7: vs. Cleveland Browns

After their win against the Baltimore Ravens 19–17, the Packers, wearing their throwback jerseys of blue and yellow, returned home to Lambeau Field to take on the Cleveland Browns. Both James Jones and Randall Cobb would be inactive for the game, and Jarrett Boykin got his first career start. He had a breakout game, catching 8 passes for 103 yards and a touchdown. After forcing the Browns to punt on their opening possession, the Packers quickly struck with a 10-yard touchdown pass to Jermichael Finley. After Brandon Weeden's pass was intercepted by Davon House on the next drive, the Packers took advantage with a 1-yard run by Eddie Lacy to take a 14–0 lead in the 1st quarter. After Cleveland scored on a 46-yard field goal, the Packers responded with a 26-yard field goal to take a 17–3 lead at halftime. In the 3rd quarter, the Browns scored on a 44-yard field goal to make it 17–6. Early in the 4th quarter, the Browns decided to go for it on 4th down and 15 on the Packers 31-yard line. The pass to Jordan Cameron in the endzone was incomplete and the Packers took over. On the drive, Jermichael Finley was carried off the field on a stretcher after suffering a neck injury. The Packers capped off that drive with a 1-yard touchdown pass to Jordy Nelson. They followed it up with a 20-yard touchdown pass to Jarrett Boykin, taking a 31–13 win. About two weeks after the game, Jermichael Finley was put on IR. With the win, the Packers extended their winning streak to three games and improved to 4–2.

Week 8: at Minnesota Vikings

After defeating the Cleveland Browns 31–13 at Lambeau Field, the Packers travelled to the Hubert H. Humphrey Metrodome to take on the Minnesota Vikings on Sunday Night Football. This was the Packers' last game at the Metrodome, for the Minnesota Vikings would play at TCF Bank Stadium for the following two seasons. On the opening kickoff, Cordarrelle Patterson returned the kick 109 yards for a touchdown. Green Bay responded with a 14 play, 7:24-minute drive that ended with an 11-yard touchdown pass to Jordy Nelson. After the Vikings punt, the Packers led a 17-play, 8:24-minute drive that ended with a 30-yard field goal. After the Vikings responded with a 36-yard field goal, Aaron Rodgers zipped a 76-yard touchdown pass to Jordy Nelson. A 93-yard punt return by Micah Hyde made it 24–10 with less than two minutes remaining. The Vikings, aided by a 26-yard pass interference penalty, scored on an 8-yard touchdown run by Adrian Peterson to make it 24–17 at halftime. On the first possession of the 2nd half, the Packers led another time-consuming drive that ended with a 1-yard touchdown run by Eddie Lacy. After Christian Ponder was sacked by Mike Daniels on 3rd down, the Packers scored easily against a tired Minnesota defense on a 25-yard run by James Starks to pull a commanding 38–17 lead at the beginning of the 4th quarter. The effective tandem between Eddie Lacy and James Starks salted the game away, and the Vikings' brief comeback fell short. The Packers had an overwhelming advantage in time of possession with 40:54 compared to the Vikings' 19:06. The Packers did not punt all night and they were 2 of 2 on fourth-down conversions. With the 44–31 win, the Packers were 5–2.

Week 9: vs. Chicago Bears

After defeating the Minnesota Vikings 44–31 for the last time in the Metrodome, the Packers returned to Lambeau to take on the Chicago Bears on Monday Night Football. The Bears were without Jay Cutler (groin), so Josh McCown made his first start in the 2013 season. The Packers moved down the field with ease on their first possession, with Rodgers completing a 27-yard pass to Jordy Nelson followed by Eddie Lacy's 16-yard run. However, the drive stalled when Aaron Rodgers was sacked by Shea McClellin on 3rd and 8, so the Packers settled for a 30-yard field goal for the 3–0 lead. Josh McCown then led a drive that ended with a 23-yard touchdown pass to Brandon Marshall, taking a 7–3 lead. It soon became apparent that Aaron Rodgers couldn't return to the game because of an injury suffered on the McClellin sack. Instead, Seneca Wallace trotted onto the field on the Packers' second possession. It ended with a tipped pass that was intercepted by Julius Peppers. The Bears' punt after their 3-and-out was blocked by Jamari Lattimore and recovered by Chris Banjo, taking possession at the Chicago 32. On the very next play, James Starks bursted through the middle for a 32-yard touchdown run, taking a 10–7 lead. In the 2nd quarter, the Bears took a 14–10 lead following a 1-yard run by Matt Forte. They added a 24-yard field goal at the end of the half to lead 17–10 at halftime. Early in the 3rd quarter, Eddie Lacy sprinted to the Chicago 1-yard line on a 56-yard gain, before punching it in himself to tie the game at 17–17. The Packers successfully recover the ensuing onside kick, but had to settle for a 23-yard field goal to take a 20–17 lead. The Bears responded with a 6-yard touchdown pass to Alshon Jeffery, taking a 24–20 lead. With 9:48 left in the 4th quarter, the Bears sustained an 18 play, 8:58-minute drive that ended with a 27-yard field goal to make it 27–20 with 53 seconds remaining in the game. The Packers tried to make a comeback, but after a 15-yard pass to Jordy Nelson, Seneca Wallace was sacked twice, first by Corey Wootton then by Shea McClellin, and time expired. With the 20–27 loss, the Packers' six-game winning streak against the Chicago Bears was snapped and the Packers fell to 5–3. It was confirmed later in the week that Aaron Rodgers suffered a fractured left collarbone, with his playing status to be determined "week to week." He ended up missing 7 weeks, only to make his return against the same Bears in Week 17 for the NFC North title decider.

Week 10: vs. Philadelphia Eagles

After the Packers' first possession, QB Seneca Wallace exited the game with a groin injury and was replaced by Scott Tolzien, who threw for 280 yards with a touchdown and two interceptions. With the loss, the Packers fell to 5–4.

Week 11: at New York Giants

Week 12: vs. Minnesota Vikings

Packers QB Scott Tolzien was benched midway through the 3rd quarter in favor of Matt Flynn. Down 23–7 at the beginning of the 4th quarter, Flynn and the offense tied the game at 23–23 to go into overtime. After the Packers offense scored a field goal in the opening possession, Minnesota was able to answer with a field goal of their own, and after a series of back-and-forth possessions, overtime came to an end at 26–26. It was the first tie between the two teams since 1978. With the tie, the Packers went to 5–5–1.

Week 13: at Detroit Lions
Thanksgiving Day game

Following a rare tie with the Minnesota Vikings 26–26 at Lambeau Field, the Packers travelled to Ford Field to take on the Detroit Lions on Thanksgiving football. Due to Matt Flynn's performance the previous week, he replaces Scott Tolzien and makes his first start for the Packers in the 2013 season. The Lions' opening possession ended at the Green Bay 12 when Clay Matthews forced a Reggie Bush fumble that was recovered by Morgan Burnett. However, the Packers could not capitalize and the Lions drew first blood with a 27-yard field goal. Following a kickoff that went out-of-bounds, the Packers answered with a 54-yard field goal to tie it at 3–3. The Packers quickly struck again when Nick Perry forced a Matthew Stafford fumble that was returned by Morgan Burnett for a touchdown for a 10–3 lead. The Lions answered by scoring two touchdowns, first a 5-yard touchdown pass to Jeremy Ross, then a 1-yard run by Reggie Bush. Detroit had opportunities for more points before the half, but David Akers missed a 31-yard field goal as the 1st half expired, keeping a 17–10 lead. Following a 3-and-out on Green Bay's opening possession in the 3rd quarter, the Lions scored on a 20-yard touchdown pass to Calvin Johnson, extending their lead 24–10. Late in the 3rd quarter, Ndamukong Suh sacked Matt Flynn in the endzone, forcing a safety that made it 26–10. The Lions capitalized on their next possession with a 1-yard run by Joique Bell. They followed that up with a 20-yard touchdown pass to Kevin Ogletree, which extended their lead 40–10. The Packers tried to rally with a 56-yard pass to James Jones, but Matt Flynn fumbled the snap on the next play; Detroit recovered and ran out the clock. This loss marked Matthew Stafford's first career win against the Packers. It also snapped the Lions' 10-year losing streak on Thanksgiving Day. With the loss, the Packers fell to 5–6–1.

Week 14: vs. Atlanta Falcons

After the heart-numbing loss to the Detroit Lions on Thanksgiving Day, the Packers returned to snowy Lambeau Field to take on the 3–9 Atlanta Falcons. Matt Flynn made his 2nd start as quarterback. The Packers struck first with a 1-yard touchdown run by Eddie Lacy just before the 1st quarter ended. However, the Falcons would answer with a 36-yard touchdown pass to Drew Davis, followed by a 2-yard reception by Tony Gonzalez following a Matt Flynn fumble. The Packers responded with a 40-yard field goal to make the score 14–10. Late in the 2nd quarter, Green Bay sustained a drive into Atlanta territory. However, on Atlanta's 35-yard line, Matt Flynn threw a pass that was deflected, intercepted and returned 71 yards for a touchdown by Sean Weatherspoon. There were audible boos as the Packers were down 21–10 at halftime. In the 3rd quarter, Matt Flynn led two drives that both resulted in field goals, making the score 21–16. As the 4th quarter began, Mike Neal forced a Matt Ryan fumble at Atlanta's 25. The Packers capitalized on the turnover with a 2-yard touchdown reception to Andrew Quarless, gaining the lead 22–21. The Packers' defense held for the rest of the 4th quarter as Atlanta missed a 52-yard field goal and also turned the ball over on downs at Green Bay's 33. A Jarrett Bush interception at Green Bay's 37 with 11 seconds remaining sealed the win for the Packers. With the win, the Packers recorded their first win since Aaron Rodgers' injury in Week 9. With the win, the Packers are 6-6-1.

Week 15: at Dallas Cowboys

Following a 22–21 comeback win against the Atlanta Falcons, the Packers travelled to AT&T Stadium, the site of Super Bowl XLV, to take on the 7–6 Dallas Cowboys. Matt Flynn made his 3rd start as Aaron Rodgers was deemed not ready to return from a broken collarbone. The two teams traded field goals with their first possessions, but Dallas went on to score 23 unanswered points to take a 26–3 lead at halftime. The 2nd half began with a bang as Eddie Lacy rushed to Dallas' 20-yard line for a 60-yard gain. Three plays later, Matt Flynn connected with Jordy Nelson for a 13-yard touchdown. Tony Romo and the Cowboys offense responded with a field goal to make it 10–29 with over 6 minutes left in the 3rd quarter. On the Packers next drive, Matt Flynn converted two 3rd downs with 22- and 21-yard passes to Andrew Quarless and Jordy Nelson, respectively. Flynn capped the drive with a 3-yard touchdown pass to Quarless to pull within 12 points. After two incompletions, Tony Romo was sacked by Clay Matthews and Dallas was forced to punt before the end of the 3rd quarter. A good punt return by Micah Hyde gave the Packers offense good field position at the Dallas 22. Early in the 4th quarter, James Starks scored on an 11-yard screen pass and made it 24–29. Dallas countered with a 5-yard touchdown pass to Dez Bryant to increase their lead back to 12, but Green Bay responded with a 3-yard touchdown pass to James Jones to make it 31–36. Dallas' next drive ended with an interception by Sam Shields at midfield with 2:50 remaining. The Packers offense led a drive that was capped off by Eddie Lacy's 1-yard touchdown that took the lead 37–36 with 1:34 remaining. After the failed 2-point attempt, Dallas attempted a field goal drive, but Tony Romo's pass was intercepted by Tramon Williams to seal the 23-point comeback win for the Packers. With the win, not only did the Packers improve to 7–6–1, but following the Detroit Lions' loss to the Baltimore Ravens on Monday night, Green Bay rose to 2nd place in the NFC North, only a half game behind the Chicago Bears. This was also the first time since 1989 that the Packers beat the Cowboys in Dallas, ending a 9-game losing streak at Dallas against the Cowboys.

Week 16: vs. Pittsburgh Steelers

Following the Packers miraculous 37–36 comeback win against the Dallas Cowboys, the Packers returned to snowy Lambeau Field to take on the Pittsburgh Steelers for the first time since Super Bowl XLV. Once again, Aaron Rodgers was inactive and Matt Flynn got the start. The two teams traded touchdowns in the first quarter, and Eddie Lacy ran 14 yards for a touchdown at the 2-minute warning. Pittsburgh responded with a 31-yard field goal to make it 10–14 at halftime. In the 3rd quarter, both teams once again traded touchdowns to make it 17–21. Pittsburgh then took the lead with an 11-yard touchdown pass to Matt Spaeth. On the Packers' next drive, Matt Flynn collided with Andrew Quarless, disrupting a pass that was intercepted and returned 40 yards for a touchdown by Cortez Allen to extend their lead 31–21. In the 4th quarter, The Packers managed to tie the game with a 22-yard field goal and a 1-yard run by John Kuhn. With a little less than 3 minutes remaining, Troy Polamalu forced a Matt Flynn fumble at the Packers 17. The Steelers took a 38–31 lead with a 1-yard touchdown run from Le'Veon Bell. After a 70-yard kick return by Micah Hyde, the Packers were at the Steelers 31-yard line with 1:25 remaining. 3 plays later they reached the Steelers 1-yard line. However, a false start penalty both pushed them back 5 yards and ran 10 seconds off the clock, leaving the Packers with one play to get into the endzone. On the final play, Matt Flynn's pass for Jarrett Boykin was incomplete and time expired. With the 38–31 loss, The Packers fell to 7-7-1 and their playoff hopes rested on the outcomes of the games played by the Detroit Lions (7-7) and the Chicago Bears (8-6). Detroit lost to the New York Giants 23–20 in OT and was eliminated from playoff contention. Meanwhile, Chicago had an opportunity to clinch the NFC North division with a win over the Eagles on Sunday Night Football, but the Eagles beat the Bears 54–11. This set up a win-and-in matchup between Green Bay (7-7-1) and Chicago (8-7) the following week. The winner would obtain the 4th seed in the NFC playoffs and the loser would be eliminated from playoff contention. This would also be Green Bay's last home loss until week 10 in 2015 against Detroit.

Week 17: at Chicago Bears 

Following the Packers' 38–31 loss to the Steelers and Chicago's 54–11 loss to the Eagles, both Green Bay (7-7-1) and Chicago (8-7) met at Soldier Field in week 17 to compete for the NFC North Championship. The NFC North Champion would enter the NFC playoffs as the 4th seed, while the other team will be eliminated from playoff contention. Three days prior to the game on Dec. 26, Packers Head Coach Mike McCarthy announced that Packers QB Aaron Rodgers (collarbone) was cleared to play against the Bears, as well as RB Eddie Lacy (ankle) and WR Randall Cobb (leg), who was activated after staying on IR with designation to return for the past 9 weeks. After forcing a Bears 3-and-out, Aaron Rodgers and the Packers established a 14-play, 75-yard drive that took 7:30 minutes. On 3rd and goal at the Chicago 5, Aaron Rodgers threw an interception to Chris Conte in the endzone. Jay Cutler and the Bears took advantage with a drive that featured a 37-yard pass to Brandon Marshall and was capped off by a 4-yard touchdown pass to Matt Forte. Early in the 2nd quarter, Aaron Rodgers threw another interception, this time to Tim Jennings at the Chicago 21-yard line. After forcing a 3-and-out, the Packers drove to the Chicago 15 and scored on a 33-yard field goal to make it 3–7. The Packers defense held Chicago to another three-and-out, and Green Bay had great field position at the Chicago 41. 6 plays later, Julius Peppers forced an Aaron Rodgers fumble that was recovered by Jarrett Boykin and run in 15 yards for a touchdown. Many players initially believed that it was an incomplete pass, but instant replay upheld the call since Rodgers' hand was empty as he propelled it forward. After the two-minute warning, A. J. Hawk forced an Alshon Jeffery fumble that was recovered and returned to the Chicago 28. The Packers offense could not find the endzone in the final seconds of the 1st half, so they settled for a 27-yard field goal and a 13–7 lead at halftime.

Early in the 3rd quarter, Devin Hester returned a punt 49 yards to the Packers 30 and Matt Forte scored on a 5-yard run to take a 14–13 lead. Four plays into Green Bay's next drive, James Starks scampered for a 41-yard gain and three plays after that Aaron Rodgers threw a 7-yard touchdown pass to Randall Cobb to retake the lead at 20–14. Chicago quickly answered with a 1-yard touchdown run by Matt Forte following a 67-yard pass to Alshon Jeffery. On the Packers' next possession, an 18-yard pass to Andrew Quarless was overruled to be an incomplete pass. Instant replay suggested there was insubstantial evidence to overturn the call, as the tip of the football disappeared between Quarless' forearms and the ground. Therefore, it remained an incomplete pass and the Packers had to punt. On the Bears' drive, Cutler completed a 33-yard pass to Matt Forte. On 3rd and goal, Cutler threw a 5-yard touchdown pass to Brandon Marshall to take a 28–20 lead at the start of the 4th quarter. However, Green Bay quickly struck back with a 6-yard touchdown run by Eddie Lacy to make it 27–28 with 11:38 remaining in the 4th quarter. After fair-catching a punt at the Green Bay 13 with 6:24 remaining, Green Bay steadily drove to the Chicago 48 in 14 plays, converting two 4th downs in the process. The Packers found themselves on 4th down & 8 with 43 seconds remaining. On the play, Aaron Rodgers side-stepped a 7-man blitz led by Bears defensive end Julius Peppers and threw a 48-yard touchdown to a wide open Randall Cobb to take a 33–28 lead with 38 seconds remaining. John Kuhn's cut-block on Peppers gave Rodgers enough room to move to his left and find Cobb. Green Bay failed on the two-point conversion, so Chicago attempted to make one more comeback. After Devin Hester's kickoff return and Martellus Bennett's 15-yard catch, the Bears were at the Green Bay 45-yard line with 24 seconds remaining. On 1st down, Morgan Burnett deflected a Hail Mary pass intended for Alshon Jeffery. On 2nd down, Brandon Marshall dropped Cutler's pass at the 27-yard line. On 3rd down with 10 seconds remaining, Cutler attempted another Hail Mary pass intended for Brandon Marshall, but it was intercepted by Sam Shields as time expired. With the 33–28 win, the Green Bay Packers (8-7-1) won their 3rd consecutive NFC North Championship and enter the 2013–14 NFC playoffs as the 4th seed.

The Packers became the only NFC team that clinched their division in the previous season to do so again this season.

Postseason

NFC Wild Card Playoff Game: vs. #5 San Francisco 49ers

Standings

Division

Conference

Statistics

Regular season statistical leaders

References

External links

Green Bay
Green Bay Packers seasons
NFC North championship seasons
Green